Rodrigo Huendra Almeida Mendonca  (born 16 March 2004), most known as Rodriguinho, is a Brazilian professional footballer who plays as a midfielder for São Paulo.

Professional career
Rodriguinho made his professional debut with São Paulo at the 2022 Copa Sudamericana 4–1 win against Universidad Católica, on 8 July 2022, and scored his first professional goal.

He becomes the first youth player of São Paulo to score a goal in the debut game.

Career statistics

Club

Notes

References

2004 births
Living people
Association football midfielders
Brazilian footballers
São Paulo FC players